Richard Jones (born 3 February 1949) is a British former racing driver.

He competed in the British Formula One Championship from 1978 to 1980.

References

1949 births
Living people
British racing drivers
British Formula One drivers
IMSA GT Championship drivers
24 Hours of Le Mans drivers
World Sportscar Championship drivers
British Formula One Championship drivers
British Touring Car Championship drivers